Citharinus gibbosus is a species of lutefish from tropical Africa.

Distribution
Found in Africa.  Very widespread in the Congo River basin, from the lower Congo up to the Lufira. It is absent from the Luapula-Moero and southern Kasaï . It is also known in Lake Tanganyika and the Malagarasi.

Size
It reaches a length of 61 cm.

References

Daget, J., 1984. Citharinidae. p. 212-216. In J. Daget, J.-P. Gosse and D.F.E. Thys van den Audenaerde (eds.) Check-list of the freshwater fishes of Africa (CLOFFA). ORSTOM, Paris and MRAC, Tervuren. Vol. 1.

Characiformes
Fish of Africa
Taxa named by George Albert Boulenger
Fish described in 1899